AS Saint-Étienne won Division 1 season 1967/1968 of the French Association Football League with 57 points.

Participating teams

 AS Aixoise
 AC Ajaccio
 Angers SCO
 Bordeaux
 RC Lens
 Lille OSC
 Olympique Lyonnais
 Olympique de Marseille
 FC Metz
 AS Monaco
 FC Nantes
 OGC Nice
 Red Star FC
 Stade Rennais UC
 FC Rouen
 AS Saint-Étienne
 RC Paris-Sedan
 FC Sochaux-Montbéliard
 RC Strasbourg
 US Valenciennes-Anzin

League table

Promoted from Division 2, who will play in Division 1 season 1968/1969
 SEC Bastia: Champion of Division 2
 Nîmes Olympique: runner-up of Division 2

Results

Top goalscorers

References

 Division 1 season 1967-1968 at pari-et-gagne.com

Ligue 1 seasons
French
1